Kınık is a village in the District of Kalecik, Ankara Province, Turkey.

History 
The name dates comes from the former Seljuk Empire. The previous name was Konak.

The customs of the village are based on ancient traditions. Weddings are custom-made and last for three days. Meals are prepared according to the old style.

The economy depends on agriculture and animal husbandry but there are insufficient agricultural resources in the village.

Geography 
The village has 200 residents. The climate is Continental, hot and often humid in summers and sometimes severely cold in winters.

Infrastructure 
The village has a drinking water supply network, electricity and landline. There are no sewage systems or health facilities in the village and no PTT branch and PTT agency.

References

Villages in Kalecik District